The World Habitat Awards were established in 1985 by the Building and Social Housing Foundation as part of its contribution to the United Nations' International Year of Shelter for the Homeless in 1987.

Two awards are given annually to projects from the Global South as well as the North that provide practical, innovative and sustainable solutions to current housing needs, which are capable of being transferred or adapted for use elsewhere.

Overview
Entries to the Awards are encouraged from housing projects and programmes that:
 demonstrate practical, innovative and sustainable solutions to current housing challenges;
 can be transferred or adapted in other countries across the world;
 are already being implemented or are completed i.e. not at design stage or in the very early stages of development; and
 view the term habitat from a broad perspective and bring a range of other benefits. We particularly encourage entries from projects and programmes that are addressing the climate emergency. Other benefits of interest to us 
include: income generation; social inclusion; community and individual empowerment; health benefits; capacity building and or education.

Previous winning projects

See also

 List of economics awards

References

Awards established in 1985
Humanitarian and service awards
Housing organizations
International awards
International development
Appropriate technology
Rural community development
Economic development awards